Phalacronothus carinulatus is a species of dung beetle native to India and Sri Lanka.

References 

Scarabaeidae
Insects of Sri Lanka
Insects of India
Insects described in 1863